Canton is the name of an electoral ward in the west of the city of Cardiff, Wales, which covers part of its namesake community, Canton. The ward elects three county councillors to the County Council of the City and County of Cardiff.

Description and history
As far back as the late 19th-century Canton was a ward to Cardiff Town Council., and has served as a ward through various local government reorganisations and boundary changes.

The current Canton ward is bordered to the north by the Pencisely Road, to the west by the River Ely and stretching as far south as Leckwith and the Cardiff City Stadium. It is separated from the Riverside ward to the east by Llandaff Road.

The Canton ward boundaries are not aligned with the historical district of Canton, with a large section of Canton's main commercial thoroughfare Cowbridge Road East is in the Riverside ward.

According to the 2011 census the population of the ward was 14,304.

In recent history Canton has been represented by the Labour Party. Councillors have included future Westminster MP, Kevin Brennan (1991-2001) and future South Glamorgan County Council leader Russell Goodway (1985-1991). Fellow Canton councillor David Thomas became Brennan's election agent during the 2001 General Election and subsequently became the MP's caseworker.

Cardiff Council elections
The Canton ward has elected three Labour councillors at every election to the new Cardiff unitary authority since 1995.

At the May 2017 elections Susan Elsmore, Stephen Cunnah and Ramesh Patel were elected. Cllr Patel had been a Canton councillor since a by-election on 1 June 2001. He had been responsible for leisure, culture and sport in Cardiff since 2013.

 

* = sitting councillor prior to the election

2014 by-election
Labour councillor (since 2008) Cerys Furlong resigned in December 2013 because of difficulties balancing her council work with her main job and her family. A by-election took place on 20 February 2014, with the Labour candidate Susan Elsmore coming top of the poll, with Plaid Cymru in second place.

Cardiff City Council elections
Prior to 1995 Canton was an electoral ward to Cardiff City Council (a district council of South Glamorgan). The ward elected three city councillors. All three city councillors were from the Conservative Party, from 1976 until being replaced by the Labour Party at the 1991 election.

South Glamorgan Council elections
Prior to 1995 Canton was a ward to South Glamorgan County Council. Two county councillors were elected at the 1973, 1977 and 1981 elections (both Conservatives until 1981). From 1985 the ward elected a single councillor. Labour's Russell Goodway was the representative until the 1991 election (when he became councillor for the Glan Ely ward).

Cardiff County Borough Council
Canton has been an electoral ward in Cardiff since the 19th-century, to Cardiff Borough Council and (between 1889 and 1974) Cardiff County Borough Council.

At the final elections of the county borough on 7 May 1970, Canton's Conservative councillor Trevor Tyrrell successfully held his seat with a 382 majority over the Labour candidate.

At the first full elections to Cardiff County Borough Council on 1 November 1889, Canton was one of only two wards to hold a contest. The two sitting Liberal Party councillors retained the seat with a healthy majority, against what the local newspaper described as a "so-called Independent" candidate.

* Ward 'retiring' councillor

References

Canton, Cardiff
Cardiff electoral wards
Electoral wards of South Glamorgan